The Battle of Weli Oya, was a battle between the militant Liberation Tigers of Tamil Eelam (LTTE or Tamil Tigers) and the Sri Lanka Army during the Sri Lankan Civil War for control of the military bases in Weli Oya in northern Sri Lanka on 28 July 1995.

Background
The LTTE launched a surprise attack, on the government controlled area of Weli Oya, aimed at overrunning four army camps (Kokkilai, Kokkuthuduvai, Jayasinghapura and Janakapura) in the area including the Weli Oya Brigade headquarters. Troops posted to these camps were mostly reservists from volunteer regiments, national guardsmen with artillery and engineering units. The army units came under the command of Brigadier Janaka Perera, Brigade Commander of the 6th "Weli Oya" Brigade, who had prepared the defense of the camps, having gain warning of a possible attack from the military intelligence.

Attack
On the morning of 28 July 1995, LTTE units which included veterans from their attack on Pooneryn armed with weapons captured from the army at Pooneryn; attacked from both land and from seaward amphibious landings. Within five hours the attack had withered with the LTTE suffering over 300 carders killed, including its leaders. The army units which had put a stiff defense had sustained 2 killed and many wounded. The attackers failed to penetrate the defense lines or knock out artillery gun placements as it had planned with the use of female suicide bombers. SLAF provided air support, knocking out LTTE transports, while the Sri Lanka Navy deployed Dvora-class fast patrol boats off the coast of Weli Oya disrupting LTTE movements at sea.

Aftermath
Soon after the battle, Brigadier Perera was transferred to command the elite Reserve Strike Force (RSF) which consisted of special forces, commando and air mobile units in Jaffna. A few months later he played a major role commanding the elite 53 Division in the Operation Riviresa which the Sri Lanka Army re-captured the whole of the Jaffna peninsula Following his retirement, Major General Janaka Perera entered politics contesting in the 2008 North Central Provincial Council election for the post of Chief Minister. Although his party failed to gained majority, he won the highest number of preferences. He was killed a few months later by a LTTE suicide bomber on 6 October 2008 in Anuradhapura.

See also
List of Sri Lankan Civil War battles
Battle of Pooneryn
Battle of Mullaitivu (1996)

References

Weli Oya
Weli Oya
1995 in Sri Lanka
July 1995 events in Asia